The Ministry of Sports of the Republic of Chile was an institution created in 2013 by President Sebastián Piñera during his first government (2010–2014).

Its first minister was Gabriel Ruíz-Tagle. Jaime Pizarro is currently minister after replacing Alexandra Benado on 11 March 2023. Benado served as minister since 11 March 2022.

References

External links
 

Government ministries of Chile